Thamizh, formerly credited as Pakoda Pandi, is an Indian actor who works in Tamil-language films.

Career 
He made his film debut as a child artist with Pasanga (2009) before starring in Marina (2012), the Hindi film Aiyaa (2012) and Goli Soda (2014). He made his lead debut in En Aaloda Seruppa Kaanom (2017) opposite Anandhi under the stage name of Thamizh.

Filmography 
All films are in Tamil, unless otherwise noted.

References

External links 

Living people
Male actors in Tamil cinema
21st-century Indian male actors
Male actors from Chennai
Indian male child actors
Indian male film actors
Year of birth missing (living people)